The Protection Command is one of the commands within the Specialist Operations directorate of London's Metropolitan Police Service. The command specialises in protective security and has two branches: Royalty and Specialist Protection (RaSP), providing protection to the royal family and close protection to government officials, and Parliamentary and Diplomatic Protection (PaDP), providing uniformed security to government buildings, officials and diplomats. In contrast with the vast majority of British police officers, many members of the Protection Command routinely carry firearms in the course of their duties and all are authorised firearms officers.

Branches

In April 2015, the branches of Protection Command and elements of Security Command were merged into two distinct branches under the control of Protection Command: Royalty and Specialist Protection (RaSP; a merger of Royalty Protection and Specialist Protection) and Parliamentary and Diplomatic Protection (PaDP; a merger of the Diplomatic Protection Group and the Palace of Westminster Division of Security Command).

Royalty and Specialist Protection

The Royalty and Specialist Protection (RaSP) was formed following a merger of the Royalty Protection Command (SO14) with the Specialist Protection Command (SO1) in April 2015.

The department has three service areas:

 Close protection for members of the Royal Family, government ministers (which includes the Prime Minister) and visiting heads of state. 
 The Special Escort Group (SEG) who provide mobile armed protection to members of the royal family and government ministers
 Armed security at royal residences in London, Windsor and Scotland.

Prior to 1978, when the Royalty Protection Branch was formed as a separate non-divisional specialist unit, royalty protection officers were attached for administrative purposes to "A" Division, although they came directly under the command of Assistant Commissioner "A".

Parliamentary and Diplomatic Protection

Parliamentary and Diplomatic Protection (PaDP) was formed following a merger of the Diplomatic Protection Group (SO6) with the Palace of Westminster Division (SO17) in April 2015.

PaDP provide armed and unarmed protection of embassies, missions and the Parliamentary Estate. They also provide residential protection for high-profile government ministers and are responsible for access control and security at Downing Street and New Scotland Yard.

PaDP was the command in which Police Constable Keith Palmer, who was killed in an attack at Westminster in 2017, worked, as did convicted kidnapper, murderer and rapist Wayne Couzens who used his status as a Police Officer to deceive his victim by falsely arresting her.

See also
List of protective service agencies
Counter Terrorism Command
Territorial Support Group
United States Secret Service
Fixated Threat Assessment Centre
Special Protection Group (India)
Federal Protective Service (United States)
Federal Protective Service (Russia)

References

External links
 Official Webpage

Metropolitan Police units
Protective security units